The 1995–96 Cypriot First Division was the 57th season of the Cypriot top-level football league. APOEL won their 16th title.

Format
Fourteen teams participated in the 1995–96 Cypriot First Division. All teams played against each other twice, once at their home and once away. The team with the most points at the end of the season crowned champions. The last three teams were relegated to the 1996–97 Cypriot Second Division. 

Cypriot teams didn't gained enough points in the previous seasons and so the champion team did not qualify to 1996–97 UEFA Champions League. The champions and the runners-up ensured their participation in the 1996–97 UEFA Cup.

The teams had to declare their interest to participate in the 1996 UEFA Intertoto Cup before the end of the championship. At the end of the championship, the higher placed team among the interested ones participated in the Intertoto Cup (if they had not secured their participation in any other UEFA competition).

Point system
Teams received three points for a win, one point for a draw and zero points for a loss.

Changes from previous season
The league expanded from 12 to 14 teams this season, comprised twelve teams from the 1994–95 season and two promoted teams from the 1994–95 Cypriot Second Division, Evagoras Paphos and Alki Larnaca.

Stadia and locations

League standings

Results

See also
 Cypriot First Division
 1995–96 Cypriot Cup
 List of top goalscorers in Cypriot First Division by season
 Cypriot football clubs in European competitions

References

Sources

Cypriot First Division seasons
Cyprus
1995–96 in Cypriot football